Vallonia tenuilabris is a species of very small, air-breathing land snail that is a terrestrial pulmonate gastropod mollusk or micromollusk in the family Valloniidae.

Distribution
Vallonia tenuilabris was described for the first time in the loess of Wiesbaden, Germany. It is only in the past few decades that its recent occurrence in Central Asia has been recognised.

Recent distribution of Vallonia tenuilabris include:
 Central Asian highlands (Altai Mountains, Tien Shan, Pamir Mountains and Himalayas)
 Northern Mongolia
 from the Baikal region into Northern Asia, from Siberia to Altai, Karakorum and Yenisei.
 North-eastern and north China including Xinjiang and Tibet.
 Northern Caucasus - the most western part of the recent range.

Description 
The width of the shell is 3 mm. The height of the shell is 1.8 mm.

Ecology 
Vallonia tenuilabris is adapted to the cold.

References
This article incorporates CC-BY-3.0 text from the reference

External links 

Valloniidae
Gastropods described in 1843